A spelling pronunciation is the pronunciation of a word according to its spelling when this differs from a longstanding standard or traditional pronunciation. Words that are spelled with letters that were never pronounced or that were not pronounced for many generations or even hundreds of years have increasingly been pronounced as written, especially since the arrival of mandatory schooling and universal literacy. 

Examples of words with silent letters that have begun to be often or sometimes pronounced include often, Wednesday, island, and knife. In addition, words traditionally pronounced with reduced vowels or omitted consonants (e.g. cupboard, Worcester), may be subject to a spelling pronunciation.

If a word's spelling was standardized prior to sound changes that produced its traditional pronunciation, a spelling pronunciation may reflect an even older pronunciation. This is often the case with compound words (e.g., waistcoat, cupboard, forehead). It is also the case for many words with silent letters (e.g. often), though not all—silent letters are sometimes added for etymological reasons, to reflect a word's spelling in its language of origin (e.g. victual, rhyming with little but derived from Late Latin victualia). Some silent letters were added on the basis of erroneous etymologies, as in the cases of the words island and scythe.

Spelling pronunciations are often prescriptively discouraged and perceived as incorrect next to the traditionally accepted, and usually more widespread, pronunciation. If a spelling pronunciation persists and becomes more common, it may eventually join the existing form as a standard variant (for example waistcoat and often), or even become the dominant pronunciation (as with forehead and falcon).

Prevalence and causes
A large number of easily noticeable spelling pronunciations occurs only in languages such as French and English in which spelling tends to not indicate the current pronunciation. Because all languages have at least some words which are not spelled as pronounced, spelling pronunciations can arise in all languages. This is of course especially true for people who are only taught to read and write and who are not taught when the spelling indicates an outdated (or etymologically incorrect) pronunciation. In other words, when many people do not clearly understand where spelling came from and what it is (a tool for recording speech, not the other way around), spelling pronunciations are common.

On the other hand, spelling pronunciations are also evidence of the reciprocal effects of spoken and written language on each other. Many spellings represent older forms and corresponding older pronunciations. Some spellings, however, are not etymologically correct.

Speakers of a language often privilege the spelling of words over common pronunciation, leading to a preference for, or prestige of, spelling pronunciation, with the written language affecting and changing the spoken language. Pronunciations can then arise that are similar to older pronunciations or that can even be completely new pronunciations that are suggested by the spelling but never occurred before.

Examples of English words with common spelling pronunciations
 kiln with a fully pronounced n, instead of a silent n. Kiln was originally pronounced kil with the n silent, as is referenced in Webster's Dictionary of 1828. From English Words as Spoken and Written for Upper Grades by James A. Bowen 1900: "The digraph ln, n silent, occurs in kiln. A fall down the kiln can kill you."
This is actually a reversion to the 15th-century pronunciation, but the pronunciation without  is still preferred by 73% of British speakers and 78% of American speakers. Older dictionaries do not list the pronunciation with  although the 2nd edition of the OED does (and the first edition notes the pronunciation with the comment that it is prevalent in the south of England and often used in singing; see the Dictionary of American Regional English for contemporaneous citations that discuss the status of the competing pronunciations). The sporadic nature of such shifts is apparent upon examination of examples such as whistle, listen and soften in which the t remains usually silent.
This is actually a reversion to the original pronunciation.
This is actually a reversion to the 15th-century pronunciation.
The  was silent in the old pronunciation: compare French faucon and the older English spellings faucon and fawcon. That may suggest either analogical change or the reborrowing of the original Latin.
In most of the United Kingdom, the traditional  pronunciation continues to prevail.
 ye (actually, yͤ or Þe), the definite article, as in Ye Olde Coffee Shoppe, is often pronounced like the archaic English pronoun ye instead of as the word the, based on the misleading use of the symbol y to substitute for the archaic printer's mark Þ: the letter thorn. (On the other hand, the beginning of the pronoun ye in Middle and Early Modern English is correctly pronounced like the beginning of you.)
 Mackenzie, Menzies, Dalziel now include the sound  in place of the original , due to the insular flat-topped g of Gaelic scripts being commonly transcribed into English as the similar-looking letter z.
The original pronunciation is reflected in, for example, the brand name "Tender Vittles".
 The pronunciation of waistcoat as waist-coat is now more common than the previous pronunciation .
 covert, historically pronounced  (reflecting its link with the verb cover) is now usually pronounced , by analogy to overt.
 medicine, historically pronounced with two syllables but now quite often with three (some speakers use two when they mean medicaments and three when they mean medical knowledge; the pronunciation with three syllables is standard in the United States).
 Anthony (from Latin Antonius), now (in Anglophone countries outside the UK) is typically .
 Numerous placenames with traditional pronunciations have been displaced by ones influenced by the spelling: St. Louis, formerly  now (in the US) , Papillion (Nebraska), formerly  now . Montpelier, the capital of Vermont, is now pronounced , instead of the French .
 Sir George Everest's surname is pronounced . The mountain named after him – Mount Everest – is generally pronounced .
 Interjections such as tsk tsk! or tut tut!
 The words Arctic, Antarctic and Antarctica were originally pronounced without the first , but the spelling pronunciation has become very common. The first c was originally added to the spelling for etymological reasons and was then misunderstood as not being silent.
 zoology, which is often pronounced zoo-ology, though, technically, this is likely influenced more by the word zoo (rhyming with goo) than by its spelling because it is never pronounced zoo-logy. (It has been posited that dropping the diaeresis in zoölogy antiquated the pronunciation .)
 hotel, originally pronounced  because of the pronunciation of the French hôtel, is now usually pronounced with an audible h. Nevertheless, maître d'hôtel is pronounced .
 herb, a word with origins in Old French, is generally pronounced with a silent h in the United States. The same was true of the United Kingdom until the 19th century, when it adopted a spelling pronunciation, with an audible h.
In German, initial s, immediately before p or t, is pronounced as if it were sch .
 nephew was, until recent generations, predominantly pronounced  in Britain, descended from Middle English nevew and originally loaned from Old French neveu, a spelling which remains unchanged into modern French. But the v was later changed to ph where the p hints at its Latin root nepot, which can be found in more recent Latin loanwords like nepotism.

Opinions

Spelling pronunciations give rise to varied opinions. Often, those who retain the old pronunciation consider the spelling pronunciation to be a mark of ignorance or insecurity. Those who use a spelling pronunciation may not be aware that it is one and consider the earlier version to be slovenly since it slurs over a letter.

Henry Watson Fowler (1858–1933) reported that in his day, there was a conscious movement among schoolteachers and others encouraging people to abandon anomalous traditional pronunciations and to speak as is spelled. According to major scholars of early modern English (Dobson, Wyld et al.), in the 17th century, there was already beginning an intellectual trend in England to pronounce as is spelled. That presupposes a standard spelling system, which was only beginning to form at the time.
Similarly, quite a large number of corrections slowly spread from scholars to the general public in France, starting several centuries ago.

A different variety of spelling pronunciations are phonetic adaptations, pronunciations of the written form of foreign words within the frame of the phonemic system of the language that accepts them. An example of that process is garage ( in French), which is sometimes pronounced  in English.

Children and foreigners

Children who read frequently often have spelling pronunciations because, if they do not consult a dictionary, they have only the spelling to indicate the pronunciation of words that are uncommon in the spoken language. Well-read second language learners may also have spelling pronunciations.

In some instances, a population in a formerly non-English-speaking area may retain such second language markers in the now native-English speaking population. For example, Scottish Standard English is replete with second language marks from when Scots started to be subsumed by English in the 17th century.

However, since there are many words that one reads far more often than one hears, adult native-language speakers also succumb. In such circumstances, the spelling pronunciation may well become more comprehensible than the other. That, in turn, leads to the language evolution mentioned above. What is a spelling pronunciation in one generation can become the standard pronunciation in the next.

In other languages

The standard then became  on the basis of the spelling, and later, in Europe, deemed closer to the English original. The standard pronunciation in Quebec French remains . Similarly, shampooing "shampoo; product for washing the hair" at the time of borrowing was  but it is now .

In Italian, a few early English loanwords are pronounced according to Italian spelling rules such as water ("toilet bowl," from English water (closet)), pronounced , and tramway, pronounced . The Italian word ovest ("west") comes from a spelling pronunciation of French ouest (which, in turn, is a phonetic transcription of English west); that particular instance of spelling pronunciation must have occurred before the 16th century, when the letters u and v were still indistinct.

A few foreign proper names are normally pronounced according to the pronunciation of the original language (or a close approximation of it), but they retain an older spelling pronunciation when they are used as parts of Italian street names. For example, the name of Edward Jenner retains its usual English pronunciation in most contexts, but Viale Edoardo Jenner (a main street in Milan) is pronounced . The use of such old-fashioned spelling pronunciations was probably encouraged by the custom of translating given names when streets were named after foreign people: Edoardo for Edward, or Giorgio for George for Via Giorgio Washington.

Also in Spanish, the acute accent in the French word élite is taken as a Spanish stress mark, and the word is pronounced .

When Slavic languages like Polish or Czech borrow words from English with their spelling preserved, the pronunciation tends to follow the rules of Polish. Words such as marketing are pronounced as spelled, instead of the more phonetically faithful .

In standard Finnish, the sound /d/ developed as a spelling pronunciation for the letter d, though it originally represented a /ð/ sound. Similarly /ts/ in words like metsä (forest) is a pronunciation spelling of tz used in pre-1770s orthography, which originally represented a long /θ/ sound. The dental fricatives had become rare by the 1700s, when the standard pronunciations started to develop into their current forms, which became official in the 1800s. The /d/ sound, however, is not present in most dialects and is generally replaced by a /r/, /l/ or simply dropped (e.g. lähde "water spring" may be pronounced as lähre, lähle or lähe). Standard ts is often replaced with tt or ht (mettä, mehtä).

In Vietnamese, initial v is often pronounced like a y in the central and southern varieties. However, in formal speech, speakers often revert to the spelling pronunciation, which is increasingly being used in casual speech as well.

Chinese has a similar phenomenon called youbian dubian where unfamiliar characters may be read with the pronunciation of similar characters that feature the same phonetic component. For instance, the character  is rarely used in Chinese but is often used in Japanese place names (where it is pronounced chō). When read in Mandarin Chinese, it came to be pronounced dīng (such as in Ximending, a district in Taipei that was named during Japanese occupation) in analogy with the character  (also pronounced dīng), even though its expected etymological reflex is tǐng.

See also 

 Acronym
 Folk etymology
 Heterography
 Hypercorrection
 Hyperforeignism
 Orthography
 Spelling reform
 The Chaos
 Padonkaffsky jargon

References

Citations

Sources 

 See the index entries under "spelling pronunciation" from Leonard Bloomfield, Language (originally published 1933; current edition 1984, University of Chicago Press, Chicago).
 Most of the etymologies and spelling histories above are taken from the Oxford English Dictionary.
 Neuman, Yishai. L'influence de l'écriture sur la langue, PhD dissertation, Paris: Sorbonne Nouvelle, 2009.
 --. "Graphophonemic Assignment", G. Khan (ed.), Encyclopedia of Hebrew Language and Linguistics, Volume 2, Leiden, South Holland: Brill, pp. 135–145.

Phonetics
Sociolinguistics
Spelling
Linguistic purism
Linguistic error